The Man from Red Gulch is a 1925 American silent Western film featuring Harry Carey.

Cast
 Harry Carey as Sandy
 Harriet Hammond as Betsey
 Frank Campeau as Falloner
 Mark Hamilton as Frisbee
 Lee Shumway as Lasham
 Doris Lloyd as Madame Le Blanc
 Frank Norcross as Col. Starbottle
 Virginia Davis as Cissy
 Michael D. Moore as Jimmy (credited as Mickey Moore)

Preservation
Prints of The Man from Red Gulch are held at the Cineteca Italiana in Milan and the UCLA Film and Television Archive.

See also
 Harry Carey filmography

References

External links

1925 films
1925 Western (genre) films
American black-and-white films
Films directed by Edmund Mortimer
Producers Distributing Corporation films
Silent American Western (genre) films
1920s American films